Stereotomy (Greek: στερεός (stereós) "solid" and τομή (tomē) "cut ") is the art and science of cutting three-dimensional solids into particular shapes. Typically this involves materials such as stone or wood which is cut to be assembled into complex structures (wall, vault, arch, etc.). In practice, the engineer makes a drawing of the intended stonework, showing where the joints in the face are to be located, and the stone cutter then details each block and cuts it to fit exactly with the others.

In technical drawing stereotomy is sometimes referred to as descriptive geometry, and "is concerned with two-dimensional representations of three dimensional objects. Plane projections and perspective drawings of solid figures are used to describe and analyze their properties for engineering and manufacturing purposes. Attention is paid to the
properties of surfaces, including normal lines and tangent planes."

References

Descriptive geometry